The 2012 Blossom Cup was a professional tennis tournament played on hard courts. It was the third edition of the tournament which was part of the 2012 ITF Women's Circuit. It took place in Quanzhou, China between 3 and 8 January 2012. It offered the prize of US$50,000.

WTA entrants

Seeds

 1 Rankings are as of December 26, 2011.

Other entrants
The following players received wildcards into the singles main draw:
  Han Xinyun
  Xu Yifan
  Zhao Yijing
  Zhou Yimiao

The following players received entry from the qualifying draw:
  Duan Yingying
  Danka Kovinić
  Sun Shengnan
  Zhang Kailin

Champions

Singles

 Kimiko Date-Krumm def.  Tímea Babos, 6–3, 6–3.

Doubles

 Chan Hao-ching /  Rika Fujiwara def.  Kimiko Date-Krumm /  Zhang Shuai, 4–6, 6–4, [10–7]

External links
ITF

Blossom Cup
2012 in Chinese tennis
Industrial Bank Cup